The Dr. B.M. Banton House is a historic two-story house in Yankton, South Dakota. It was built in 1920-1921 and designed in the California bungalow style by Dr. B.M. Banton, a dentist. It has been listed on the National Register of Historic Places since October 8, 1987.

References

National Register of Historic Places in Yankton County, South Dakota
Houses completed in 1920
1920 establishments in South Dakota
Bungalow architecture in Montana